The Turkish Bath is an oil painting by Jean-Auguste-Dominique Ingres, initially completed between 1852 and 1859, but modified in 1862. The painting depicts a group of nude women at a pool in a harem. It has an erotic style that evokes both the Near East and earlier western styles associated with mythological subject matter. The painting expands on a number of motifs that Ingres had explored in earlier paintings, in particular The Valpinçon Bather (1808) and La Grande odalisque (1814).

The work is signed and dated 1862, when Ingres was around 82 years old. He altered the original rectangular format and changed the painting to a tondo. A photograph of its original state, taken by Charles Marville, survives.

Description

The painting is known for its subtle colourisation, especially the very pale skin of the women resting in the privacy of a bathing area. The figures are given an almost abstract and "slender and sinuous" form, and seem at times to lack skeleton. They are arranged in a very harmonious, circular manner, a curved  arrangement that heightens the eroticism of the painting. Its charge is in part achieved through the use of motifs that include the implied haze of Oriental perfume, and the inclusion of vases, running water, fruit and jewels, as well as a palette that ranges from pale white to pink, ivory, light greys and a variety of browns.

Ingres relished the irony of producing an erotic work in his old age, painting an inscription of his age (AETATIS LXXXII, "at age 82") on the work—in 1867 he told others that he still retained "all the fire of a man of thirty years". He did not paint this work from live models, but from croquis and several of his earlier paintings, reusing "bather" and "odalisque" figures he had drawn or painted as single figures on beds or beside a bath.

The figure from The Valpinçon Bather appears almost identically as the central element of the later composition, but now plays a mandolin. The woman in the background with her arm extended and holding a cup resembles the sitter in his portrait of Madame Moitessier (1856). The face of the woman with her arms raised above her head in the near right is similar to a croquis (1818) of the artist's wife, Delphine Ramel, though her right shoulder is lowered while her right arm is raised. The other bodies are juxtaposed in various unlit areas behind them.

Ingres drew from a wide variety of painterly sources, including 19th-century academic art, Neoclassicism and late Mannerism. The colourisation is one of "chastising coolness", while figures merge into each other in a manner that evokes sexuality, but ultimately is intended to show Ingres's skill at defying rational perspective.

Orientalist influences
Ingres was influenced by the contemporary fashion for Orientalism, relaunched by Napoleon's invasion of Egypt. On leaving for Italy in 1806, he copied in his notebooks a text extolling "the baths of the seraglio of Mohammed", in which can be read a description of a harem where one "goes into a room surrounded by sofas [...] and it is there that many women destined for this use attend the sultana in the bath, wiping her handsome body and rubbing the softest perfumes into her skin; it is there that she must then take a voluptuous rest".

In 1825, he copied a passage from Letters from the Orient by Lady Mary Wortley Montagu, who had accompanied her British diplomat husband to the Ottoman Empire in 1716. Her letters had been re-published eight times in France alone between 1763 and 1857, adding to the Orientalist craze. The passage Ingres copied was entitled "Description of the women's bath at Adrianople" and reads: "I believe there were two hundred women there in all. Beautiful naked women in various poses... some conversing, others at their work, others drinking coffee or tasting a sorbet, and many stretched out nonchalantly, whilst their slaves (generally ravishing girls of 17 or 18 years) plaited their hair in fantastical shapes." The environment of The Turkish Bath, however, bears little resemblance to the public bathing described by Lady Montagu.

In contrast to Eugène Delacroix, who visited an Algerian harem, Ingres never travelled to Africa or the Middle East, and the courtesans shown are more Caucasian and European than Middle Eastern or African in appearance. For Ingres the oriental theme was above all a pretext for portraying the female nude in a passive and sexual context. Exotic elements are few and far between in the image: musical instruments, a censer and a few ornaments.

Provenance
The painter's first buyer was a relation of Napoleon III, but he handed it back some days later, his wife having found it "unsuitable" ("peu convenable"). It was purchased in 1865 by Khalil Bey, a former Turkish diplomat who added it to his collection of erotic paintings.

Edgar Degas demanded that The Turkish Bath be shown at the Exposition Universelle (1855), in the wake of which came contrasting reactions: Paul Claudel, for example, compared it to a "cake full of maggots". At the start of the 20th century, patrons wished to offer The Turkish Bath to the Louvre, but the museum's council refused it twice. After the national collections of Munich offered to buy it, the Louvre finally accepted it in 1911, thanks to a gift by the Société des amis du Louvre, to whom the patron Maurice Fenaille made a three-year interest-free loan of 150,000 Francs for the purpose.

See also
Orientalism
Turkish bath
Seraglio
Haremlik
 100 Great Paintings, 1980 BBC series

References

External links 
The Turkish Bath, Musée du Louvre
Un rêve oriental  by Michel Makarius, Musée critique de la Sorbonne 
Bathing, Musée historique environnement urbain

Paintings by Jean-Auguste-Dominique Ingres
1862 paintings
Paintings in the Louvre by French artists
Nude art
Musical instruments in art
Dance in art
Bathing in art
Public baths
Bathing
Sauna
Erotic art